Elsa is the debut album of the French singer Elsa Lunghini, released in 1988.

Background and critical reception

After the success of her first two singles, "T'en va pas", which peaked at #1 for eight weeks on the official singles chart (Top 50), and "Quelque chose dans mon cœur", #2 hit, Elsa decided to release her first album. In it, there are collaborations with Didier Barbelivien, Élisabeth Anaïs for texts, and her father (Georges Lunghini) for compositions. Georges also co-signed ten of the eleven songs on the album.

In the French TV program Sacrée Soirée compered by Jean-Pierre Foucault, Elsa met Glenn Medeiros, which generated the duet "Un Roman d'amitié (Friend Give Me a Reason)". It was the next single from the album. Once again, it was a success, reaching #1 on the Top 50 for six weeks during 1988 summer. Thereafter, Elsa also released three other singles on this album, which were all ranked in the top ten on the singles chart.

This debut album was very successful. In addition to the huge sales of the singles, it was certified double platinum by the SNEP, the French certifier, for more than 600,000 sales in France.

Elsa's first single, "T'en va pas", was not included in this album. The song "Nostalgia cinema" is a reference to the Italian origins of her father.

Track listing

1 Laurent Voulzy participated in the background vocals.

Album credits

Personnel
Claude Salmiéri - drums
Yves Sanna - drums
Kamil Rustam - guitar
Bernard Paganotti - bass guitar
Jannick Top - bass guitar
Michel Gaucher - saxophone
Vincent-Marie Bouvot - keyboards
Raymond Donnez - keyboards
Catherine Bonnevay - backing vocals ("Mon cadeau" & "Celui qui viendra")
Francine Chantereau - backing vocals ("Mon cadeau" & "Celui qui viendra")

Production
Arrangement - Vincent-Marie Bouvot, Raymond Donnez
Produced by Vincent-Marie Bouvot & Georges Lunghini
Engineered by Bruno Lambert, Jean Lamoot & Hervé Le Coz
Assistant engineer - Manuela
Mixed by Bruno Lambert
Mixed by Claude Grillis ("Mon cadeau", "Jimmy voyage", "Le rôle de sa vie" & "Celui qui viendra")

Design
Georges Lunghini - photography
Claude Caudron - cover design

Charts, certifications and sales

References

1988 debut albums
Elsa Lunghini albums